Enno II of East Frisia (1505 – 24 September 1540 in Emden) was the son of Edzard I of East Frisia. In 1528 he became count of East Frisia. For most of his life he ruled together with Johan I of East Frisia, who remained Catholic, while Enno was Lutheran.

Enno II lost Jever because he failed to fulfill the marriage obligations his father had arranged for him to Maria of Jever. Enno and his brother Johan were supposed to marry the heirs of Jever, but Enno broke off the arrangement, which greatly offended Maria of Jever, who as a result became a lifelong enemy of Enno. She made sure that Jever was given to the County of Oldenburg after her death.

Enno also voluntarily relinquished Butjadingen at his marriage to Anna of Oldenburg (1501–1575). Only Harlingerland remained, ruled by the aggressive chieftain, Balthasar Oomkens von Esens. Enno drove out Balthasar in 1530, but he returned and devastated East Frisia with help from the duke of Guelders. Enno was forced to recognise Balthasar as Chieftain of Harlingerland. Enno did not come out well from his feud with Guelders.
Enno played an important role in the attacks on the numerous East Frisian abbeys and monasteries. He confiscated their possessions to finance his wars. Enno died at the age of 35, and his wife Anna of Oldenburg became regent for their sons.

Children
 Elisabeth, 1531–1555, married in 1553 count Johann V of Schaumburg-Pinneberg (1531–1560)
 Edzard II, 1532–1599
 Hedwig, 1535–1616, married in 1562 to duke Otto II of Brunswick-Harburg (1528–1603)
 Anna, 1534–1552
 Christoffel, 1536–1566
 Johan II, 1538–1591.

Ancestors 

1505 births
1540 deaths
Counts of East Frisia